Ley is a lunar impact crater that is located across the southern rim of the much larger walled plain Campbell. Intruding into the south-southwestern rim of Ley is the slightly larger crater Von Neumann. The debris from the formation of Von Neumann has produced a bulging rampart that occupies the southwest interior floor of Ley. The outer rim of Ley has undergone impact erosion, and is marked by a number of small craters. The inner wall is also worn, and the interior floor is pock-marked by a number of small craters. There is a small, cup-shaped crater on the floor to the northwest of the midpoint.

References

 
 
 
 
 
 
 
 
 
 
 
 

Impact craters on the Moon